Nossa Senhora do Rosario church (Portuguese for Our Lady of the Rosary) is a 15th century church in the town of Cidade Velha on the island of Santiago, Cape Verde. It is located in the northwest of the town, near the right (west) bank of the stream Ribeira Grande de Santiago. The historic centre of Cidade Velha is an UNESCO World Heritage Site since June 2009.

History
The main part of the church was built in 1495, which makes it the oldest surviving building of Cidade Velha. Its Manueline side chapel is a rare example of Gothic architecture in Sub-Saharan Africa. The church has been heavily restored.

See also
List of churches in Cape Verde
List of buildings and structures in Santiago, Cape Verde

References

Roman Catholic churches in Cape Verde
Ribeira Grande de Santiago
Portuguese colonial architecture in Cape Verde